Electric Youth is the second studio album by American singer-songwriter Debbie Gibson, released on January 24, 1989, by Atlantic Records. It is the highest-charting album of Gibson's career, staying at the top of the US Billboard 200 albums chart for five weeks, and reaching number 8 on the UK Albums Chart.

Composition 
As with her debut album, Out of the Blue, all tracks were written by Gibson, and she single-handedly produced six of the tracks. She was also given half of the production credits on one track alongside Fred Zarr who produced the other four tracks. The album, like her first, contains mainly bubblegum-pop songs, though other, more mature styles are touched upon.

Singles
Electric Youth spawned four singles, the first being "Lost in Your Eyes," which became her second No. 1 on the Billboard Hot 100 and stayed there for three weeks. "Electric Youth", the album's title track, just missed the Top 10, reaching No. 11. "No More Rhyme" followed, ending its run at No. 17, and "We Could Be Together" charted at No. 71.

Commercial success
In the US, the album was certified 2× Platinum by the RIAA and sold over 4 million copies worldwide. Gibson promoted the album with "The Electric Youth World Tour" in 1989.  In parallel with the album, she created an Electric Youth perfume under Revlon, and various makeup essentials for young girls through Natural Wonder Cosmetics, one of her sponsors at the time, distributed throughout the U.S.

The album also inspired an original stage musical of the same name which premiered at the Starlight Dinner Theatre (formerly Mark Two Dinner Theatre) in Orlando, Florida.  Dean Parker wrote the book and Gibson co-produced.

Reissues
The album was included in the 2017 box set We Could Be Together, with seven remixes as bonus tracks.

A special four-disc digipack edition was released by Cherry Red Records on November 26, 2021. This release includes two remix CDs and a DVD containing the album's four music videos and the live video Live Around the World.

Track listing
All tracks are written by Deborah Gibson (Music Sales Corporation, ASCAP), except where indicated; all tracks are produced by Deborah Gibson, except where indicated.

Charts and certifications

Weekly charts

Certifications and sales

Personnel

Musicians
Debbie Gibson - lead and backing vocals, piano, keyboards, additional keyboards, drum programming
Fred Zarr - keyboards, drum programming, piano (tracks 1–3, 5, 7–8, 10–11)
Greg Savino - keyboards (track 6)
Leslie Ming - hi hat (tracks 1, 3, 8–9)
Bashiri Johnson - percussion (tracks 1–5, 7–11)
Adam Tese - percussion, saxophone (track 6)
Lou Appel - drums (tracks 5–6)
Ira Siegel - acoustic guitar, electric guitar (tracks 1, 4–5, 7–11)
Tommy Williams - electric guitar, acoustic guitar (tracks 2–3, 6)
Kirk Powers Burkhardt - bass (tracks 2-3-5-6)
Bob Osman - cello (track 8)
Jeff Smith - saxophone (tracks 1, 8)
Roger Rosenberg - flute solo (track 5)
Ed Palermo - tenor saxophone (Cadillac Horns) (tracks 8, 10)
Bud Burridge - trumpet (Cadillac Horns) (tracks 8, 10)
Matt Finders - trombone (Cadillac Horns) (tracks 8, 10)
Carrie Johnson - backing vocals (tracks 1, 3, 7–8, 10–11)
Libby Johnson - backing vocals (tracks 1, 7, 10–11)
Keeth Stewart - backing vocals (tracks 1, 9–10)
Tim Lawless - backing vocals (tracks 8, 11)
Sandra St. Victor - backing vocals (track 8)
Linda Moran - backing vocals (track 10)

Production
Debbie Gibson - arranger, mixing (tracks 1–7, 9–10)
Fred Zarr - arranger, mixing (tracks 1–3, 5, 7–8, 10–11)
Don Feinberg - recording engineer
Phil Castellano - recording engineer, mix engineer, additional engineering, mixing (tracks 2–3, 5, 8, 11)
Bill Scheniman - recording engineer (track 6)
Mario Salvatti - additional engineering (track 6)
Rich Travali - additional engineering (track 9)
Matt Malles - assistant engineer
Bill Esses - assistant engineer, additional engineering, programming engineer (tracks 1–10)
Jim Goatley - assistant engineer, assistant mix engineer (tracks 2, 5–6, 8)
Bob Rosa - mix engineer, mixing (tracks 1–2, 6–7, 9)
Bob "Bassie" Brockmann - mix engineer, mixing (tracks 4, 10)
Tom Vercillo - assistant mix engineer (tracks 1–3, 6–7, 9–11)
Chris Floberg - assistant mix engineer (tracks 3, 10–11)
David Lebowitz - assistant mix engineer (tracks 3–4, 10–11)
Diane Gibson - management
Douglas Breitbart - executive producer
Albert Watson - photography
Greg Porto - Logo Design
Fran Cooper - makeup
Kerry Warn - hair
Freddie Leiba - stylist
David Salidor - publicity
Abbe Rosenfeld - session coordinator
Howie Weinberg - mastering (Masterdisk)

References

External links
 
 
 

1989 albums
Debbie Gibson albums
Atlantic Records albums
Bubblegum pop albums